Neuvonen is a Finnish and Estonian surname. It may refer to:

 Aarni Neuvonen, Estonian perpetrator of employment fraud
 Anssi Neuvonen, Finnish songwriter, musician and producer, frontman of indie rock band NEØV
 Kiti Neuvonen, member of Finnish band Agit-Prop
 Robin Neuvonen, Finnish-Canadian musician, tree planter